Paulo Sérgio Silvestre do Nascimento (born 2 June 1969), commonly known as Paulo Sérgio, is a Brazilian former footballer who played as a forward. Whilst at German club Bayern Munich, he won the Champions League in 2001.

Club career
Paulo Sérgio rose to prominence at Corinthians, where he was a key player in the early 1990s. In 1993, he was signed by Bayer Leverkusen, where he played for four seasons. His form was good enough for him to be included in the Brazilian national team, although he was not among the top scorers of Bundesliga. He was rated as a top class second striker.

In 1997, Paulo Sérgio was bought by Italian club Roma, where he played for two seasons. He formed an effective striking partnership with the emerging Francesco Totti and Marco Delvecchio, scoring 22 goals in 57 league appearances. When Roma signed Vincenzo Montella from relegated Sampdoria in 1999, he moved on. FC Bayern Munich became his new employer, and in his three years at Bayern, he won both Champions League and Bundesliga, his finest club honours.

In 2002, Bayern signed several new players, and Paulo Sérgio was no longer in the first team plans, prompting him to move to Al-Wahda in Abu Dhabi, before finishing his career back in Bahia in his native Brazil.

Post-retirement
He started his coaching career at Red Bull Brasil in 2008. On the team, he worked with another former idol of the Corinthians: Gilmar Fubá. He was the presenter and judge of the Menino de Ouro (en:Golden Boy) reality show, shown by the SBT between 2013 and 2014. He was also Sports Secretary of the Municipality of Barueri between January 2013 and June 2015.He currently has the Business Management company PS7TE Participações and is a Bundesliga ambassador. Between 2018 and 2021, he was hired by RedeTV!, where he joined the sports department as a commentator. In September 2021, he was hired to comment on the programs Mesa Redonda e Gazeta Esportiva, shown by TV Gazeta.

International career
Paulo Sérgio was capped for Brazil 13 times between 1991 and 1994, scoring twice, and was a member of the Brazilian squad that won the 1994 FIFA World Cup.

Career statistics

Club

Honours

Club
Bayern Munich
 UEFA Champions League: 2000–01
 Intercontinental Cup: 2001
 Bundesliga: 1999–2000, 2000–01
 DFB-Pokal: 1999–2000
 DFB-Ligapokal: 1999, 2000

International
Brazil
 FIFA World Cup: 1994

References

External links
 Leverkusen who's who
 

1969 births
Living people
Footballers from São Paulo
Brazilian footballers
Association football forwards
Sport Club Corinthians Paulista players
Grêmio Esportivo Novorizontino players
Bayer 04 Leverkusen players
A.S. Roma players
FC Bayern Munich footballers
Al Wahda FC players
Esporte Clube Bahia players
Campeonato Brasileiro Série A players
Bundesliga players
Serie A players
UAE Pro League players
UEFA Champions League winning players
Brazil international footballers
1994 FIFA World Cup players
FIFA World Cup-winning players
Brazilian expatriate footballers
Brazilian expatriate sportspeople in Germany
Expatriate footballers in Germany
Brazilian expatriate sportspeople in Italy
Expatriate footballers in Italy
Brazilian football managers
Red Bull Brasil managers